Anthropopathism (from Greek ἄνθρωπος anthropos, "human" and πάθος pathos, "suffering") is the attribution of human emotions, or the ascription of human feelings or passions to a non-human being, generally to a deity.

By comparison, the term anthropomorphism originally referred to the attribution of human form to a non-human being, but in modern usage anthropomorphism has come to encompass both meanings.

Religion

This is a technique prevalent in religious writings, where, for instance, human emotion is attributed to God, where he would not normally experience emotion in this sense.
This technique is particularly notable in the book of Genesis, as an example of the theme of God as a personal god. Some Bible scholars, however, argue that human emotions ascribed to God are indicative of divine responses within the matrix of human history that are in fact analogous to human emotions though not univocal.

See also
 Frankenstein complex
 Pathetic fallacy
 Philo's view of God
 Uncanny valley
Theopaschism

References

Anthropomorphism
Emotion
Philosophy of religion